XHNY-FM is an Exa FM-formatted Spanish & English Top 40 (CHR) music radio station broadcasting on a frequency of 93.5 MHz in Irapuato, Guanajuato.

References

Radio stations in Guanajuato
Irapuato